Schisandra grandiflora, called the large-flowered magnolia vine, is a species of flowering plant in the genus Schisandra, native to the Himalayas and Tibet. A deciduous, twining climber, it has gained the Royal Horticultural Society's Award of Garden Merit as an ornamental.

References

grandiflora
Flora of Tibet
Flora of Nepal
Flora of East Himalaya
Flora of West Himalaya
Plants described in 1872